Russian Gymnastics Federation can refer to:
 Artistic Gymnastics Federation of Russia
 Russian Rhythmic Gymnastics Federation